Pseudokineococcus is a genus of bacteria from the family of Kineosporiaceae.

References

Actinomycetia
Bacteria genera